Monica (born Rekha Maruthiraj) is a former Indian actress, who starred predominantly in Tamil language films. A child actor in the early 1990s, she mostly appeared in supporting roles, before taking lead roles from the late 2000s on. She is probably best known for performances in the films Azhagi, Imsai Arasan 23m Pulikesi and Silandhi. In 2012, she changed her name to Parvana for Malayalam films. In 2014, she converted to Islam, changing her name to M. G. Rahima, and announced that she had quit acting.

Personal life

On 30 May 2014, Monica embraced islam with her new name M. G. Raheema where M is Maruthi Raj (father) and G is Gracy (mother). Monika's father is Hindu and mother is a Christian.

Rahima married Malik, a Chennai-based entrepreneur who hails from Salem. Malik is into import and export of electronic items.

Filmography

References

External links
 

Indian film actresses
Tamil actresses
Living people
Tamil Nadu State Film Awards winners
Actresses from Tamil Nadu
People from Tirunelveli
Actresses in Malayalam cinema
Actresses in Telugu cinema
Actresses in Kannada cinema
Child actresses in Tamil cinema
Child actresses in Malayalam cinema
20th-century Indian actresses
21st-century Indian actresses
Year of birth missing (living people)
Actresses in Tamil cinema
Actresses in Tamil television
Converts to Islam